Byrne (also O'Byrne) is an Irish surname. It is derived from the Gaelic Ó Broin or Ó Beirn. 

There are two Irish surnames which have Byrne as their English spelling; the most common comes from Ó Broin, which refers to the Leinster-based family of Bran as described below. The less common family name is Ó Beirn or Ó Beirne, which comes from a different family and is most commonly found in the Northwest of Ireland.

The most prominent Byrnes were the O'Byrne family of Leinster.

List of people surnamed Byrne or O'Byrne

A–D
Alan Byrne (disambiguation), several people
Alexandra Byrne, British costume designer
Alfie Byrne, Lord Mayor of Dublin and TD
Allie Byrne, British actress
Andrew Byrne, first Catholic Bishop of Little Rock
Andrew Hozier-Byrne, better known under his stage name Hozier (born 1990), Irish singer and songwriter
Anthony Byrne (disambiguation), several people
Bill Byrne (disambiguation), several people
Billy Byrne (disambiguation), several people
Bob Byrne, Irish comics writer
Bradley Byrne (born 1965), American business attorney and politician
Brendan Byrne, Governor of New Jersey from 1974 to 1982
Brian Byrne, Canadian musician
Bryan Byrne (footballer), Irish footballer
Catherine Byrne (disambiguation), several people
Celine Byrne (born 1980), Irish opera soprano
Charles Byrne (disambiguation), several people
Charlie Byrne (disambiguation), several people
Christopher Byrne (disambiguation), several people named Chris or Christopher
Cliff Byrne, Irish footballer
Conan Byrne, Irish footballer
Condon Byrne, Australian politician
Connor Byrne (born 1964), Irish actor
Conor Byrne (died 1948), Irish politician and medical practitioner
Damien Byrne, Irish footballer
Danny Byrne, English footballer
David Byrne (born 1952), Scottish-born American musician
David Byrne (disambiguation), several people
Dean Byrne (disambiguation), several people
Debra Byrne, Australian singer
Declan Byrne, fictional character in British soap opera Family Affairs
Denis Byrne, Irish sportsman
Dominic Byrne, British newsreader and presenter
Donald Byrne, American chess player
Donn Byrne, Irish novelist
Doris I. Byrne (1905–1975), New York politician and judge

E–J
Edward Byrne (disambiguation), several people
Emma Byrne, Irish footballer
Emma Byrne (author), British author
Emmet Byrne, US Representative from Illinois
Eric Byrne, Irish politician
Eugene Byrne, English writer
Fiach McHugh O'Byrne (1534–1597), Irish Lord of Ranelagh and sometime leader of the Clann Uí Bhroin
Francis Byrne (politician) (1877–1938), Liberal member of the Legislative Assembly of Quebec
Francis John Byrne, Irish historian
Frank Byrne (Australian politician) (1837–1923), Member of the New South Wales Legislative Assembly
Frank Byrne (Irish nationalist), instigator of the Irish National Invincibles
Frank M. Byrne, eighth governor of South Dakota
Gabriel Byrne (born 1950), Irish actor
Gay Byrne (1934–2019), Irish broadcaster
George Byrne (1892–1973), English cricketer
Gerry Byrne (disambiguation), several people
Gonçalo Byrne (born 1941), Portuguese architect
Henry Byrne (1920–1976), Irish politician
Henry Byrne (disambiguation), several people
Hollis Byrne, Irish rapper/ singer
Hugh Byrne (disambiguation), several people
James Byrne (disambiguation), several people
Jane Byrne, mayor of Chicago, Illinois
Jason Byrne (disambiguation), several people
Jennifer Byrne (born 1955), Australian journalist
Jenny Byrne (born 1967), Australian tennis player
Joe Byrne (1856–1880), Australian outlaw
Joe Byrne (Northern Ireland politician), Irish politician
John Byrne (disambiguation), several people named John or Johnny
Julie Byrne, American musician
Josh Byrne,  professional lacrosse player.  Buffalo Bandits and Chaos

K–Z
Kevin P. Byrne, United States Navy admiral
Kurtis Byrne, Irish professional association football player
Lee Byrne, Welsh rugby player
Leo Christopher Byrne, American Roman Catholic archbishop
Leslie Byrne, US Congresswoman from the state of Virginia
Liam Byrne, British politician
Liam Byrne (rugby league), Irish international rugby league footballer
Liam Byrne (Irish criminal) (born 1980), Irish gangster and criminal
Mairéad Byrne, Irish poet
Margaret Byrne, Australian scientist
Margaret Mary Byrne (born 1949), American politician
Mark Byrne, Irish football player
Martha Byrne, American actress
Mary Byrne (disambiguation), several people
Matt Byrne (born 1974), British Paralympic wheelchair basketball player
Matt Byrne, drummer of the American band Hatebreed
Michael Byrne (disambiguation), several people
Myles Byrne, a leader in the Irish rebellion of 1798
Neil Byrne, Irish singer in the group Celtic Thunder
Nicky Byrne, member of Irish boy band Westlife
Oliver Byrne (football chairman) (1944–2007), CEO of Irish soccer club Shelbourne F.C.
Oliver Byrne (mathematician) (1810–1880), Irish civil engineer and author
Pat Byrne (footballer), Irish football player and manager
Patricia M. Byrne (1925–2007), American diplomat
Makenzie byrne 2009-2023 a volleyball player 
Patrick Byrne (disambiguation), several people
Patsy Byrne, English actress
Paul Byrne (disambiguation), several people
Paula Byrne, British author
Peter Byrne (disambiguation), several people
Richie Byrne, Irish footballer
Robert Byrne (disambiguation), several people
Roger Byrne, English footballer
Rose Byrne, Australian actress
Rosemary Byrne, Member of the Scottish parliament
Rory Byrne, South African car designer
Sam Byrne (footballer), Irish footballer
Sean Byrne (disambiguation), several people
Shane Byrne (disambiguation), several people
Shaun Byrne (disambiguation), several people 
Shay Byrne, Irish radio host
Sophie Byrne, Australian filmmaker
Stephen Byrne (disambiguation), several people
Steve Byrne, American comedian and actor
Terry Byrne, English football manager
Thomas Byrne (disambiguation), several people
Todd Byrne, Australian rugby player
Tommy Byrne (disambiguation), several people
Tony Byrne (disambiguation), Irish boxer
Walter Byrne (1849–1931), professional baseball umpire in 1882, see List of Major League Baseball umpires
William Byrne (disambiguation), several people
William O'Byrne (1908–1951), English cricketer
William Richard O'Byrne (1823–1896), Irish biographer and politician

Given name
 Byrne Offutt, American actor
 Byrne Piven (1929–2002), American actor

Other uses
Byrne: A Novel by Anthony Burgess
Byrne Dairy, based in New York
Caroline Byrne case, relating to the death of the Australian model
David Byrne (album), by the musician of the same name
O'Byrne Cup

See also
Byrnes (disambiguation)
Bryne (disambiguation)
Irish nobility

References

Further reading
 Byrne-Rothwell, Daniel. The Byrnes and the O'Byrnes. House of Lochar, 2010. 

English-language surnames
Surnames of Irish origin
Anglicised Irish-language surnames